Ryutaro Nomura (February 27, 1859 – September 18, 1943) was a Japanese businessman. He was born in Gifu Prefecture. He was a graduate of the University of Tokyo. He was twice President of the South Manchuria Railway (1913–1914, 1919–1921). He was a recipient of the Order of the Sacred Treasure and the Order of the Rising Sun.

References

External links
 

1859 births
1943 deaths
Japanese businesspeople
People from Gifu Prefecture
University of Tokyo alumni
Recipients of the Order of the Sacred Treasure, 3rd class
Recipients of the Order of the Rising Sun, 3rd class
Presidents of the Japan Society of Civil Engineers